Frances Amélia Tupper, Lady Tupper (née Morse; March 14, 1826 – May 11, 1912) was the wife of Sir Charles Tupper, the sixth Prime Minister of Canada. They had six children together, three boys and three girls.

Legacy
Two of their sons, Charles Hibbert Tupper and William Johnston Tupper, also had careers in politics. Lady Tupper was born in Amherst, Nova Scotia.

See also
Spouse of the prime minister of Canada

References

1826 births
1912 deaths
Colony of Nova Scotia people
Spouses of prime ministers of Canada
Wives of baronets